Joint ownership refers to: 

 Housing equity partnership
 Jointly owned photovoltaic plant
 Co-ownership (disambiguation)
 Joint venture, a business entity created by two or more parties

See also 
 Concurrent estate